Eugene Howard Spafford (born 1956), known as Spaf, is an American professor of computer science at Purdue University and a computer security expert.

Spafford serves as an advisor to U.S. government agencies and corporations. In 1998, he founded and was the first director of the Center for Education and Research in Information Assurance and Security (CERIAS) at Purdue University.

Biography

Education and early career
Spafford attended the State University of New York at Brockport, graduating with a double major in mathematics and computer science in three years. He then attended the School of Information and Computer Sciences (now the College of Computing) at the Georgia Institute of Technology. He received his Master of Science (M.S.) in 1981, and Doctor of Philosophy (Ph.D.) in 1986, for his design and implementation of the kernel of the original Clouds distributed operating system.

During the formative years of the Internet, Spafford made significant contributions to establishing semi-formal processes to organize and manage Usenet, then the primary channel of communication between users, and to defining the standards of behavior governing its use. Spafford initiated the Phage List as a response to the Morris Worm, one of the earliest computer worms.

Computer science at Purdue
Spafford has served on the faculty at Purdue University in Indiana since 1987, and is a full professor of computer science. He is executive director emeritus of Purdue's Center for Education and Research in Information Assurance and Security (CERIAS), and founded its predecessor, the COAST Laboratory. He has stated that his research interests have focused on "the prevention, detection, and remediation of information system failures and misuse, with an emphasis on applied information security. This has included research in fault tolerance, software testing and debugging, intrusion detection, software forensics, and security policies." 

Spafford wrote or co-authored four books on computer and computer security, including Practical Unix and Internet Security for O'Reilly Media, and over 150 research papers, chapters, and monographs. In 1996, he received the Award of Distinguished Technical Communication from the Society for Technical Communication for Practical Unix and Internet Security.

As a PhD advisor, Spafford supervised development of the Open Source Tripwire tool coded by his student Gene Kim. Spafford was the chief external technical advisor to the company Tripwire during their first few years. He was also graduate advisor to  Dan Farmer who coded the freeware Computer Oracle and Password System (COPS) tool. 

In 2009, Spafford discussed on C-SPAN an article in The New York Times that looked at how the Internet had been a conduit for many types of cybercrime.

Recent work from Spafford has shown how to deceive adversaries and thus make computing systems more secure, drawing on his multi-disciplinary expertise in information security and psychology.

Spafford is on the board of directors of the Computing Research Association and is the former chairperson of the Association for Computing Machinery's (ACM) US Public Policy Committee. He was a member of the President's Information Technology Advisory Committee from 2003 to 2005 and an advisor to the National Science Foundation (NSF). Spaf is a Fellow of the American Association for the Advancement of Science (1999) and the American Academy of Arts and Sciences (2020).

Selected honors and awards
1996 Awarded charter membership in the Institute of Electrical and Electronics Engineers (IEEE) IEEE Computer Society's Golden Core for distinguished service to the Computer Society during its first 50 years
2000 National Institute of Standards and Technology (NIST) and National Computer Security Center (NCSC) National Computer Systems Security Award
2001 Named to the Information Systems Security Association (ISSA) Hall of Fame
2003 Awarded United States Air Force medal for Meritorious Civilian Service
2007 ACM President's Award
2009 Computing Research Association Distinguished Service Award
2013 Elected to the National Cybersecurity Hall of Fame
2017 Received the International Federation for Information Processing (IFIP) TC-11 Kristian Beckman Award
2020 IEEE Security and Privacy Symposium Test of Time Award
2022 Honorary Professor of the University of Nottingham.

See also
The Great Renaming

References

External links

, at Purdue
Greplaw interview
Part 1: Gene Spafford on security threats, PKI, interoperability, privacy and wireless security
Part 2: Gene Spafford on key management, backup and recovery, digital certificate revocation, identity fraud and security trends
Practical Unix and Internet Security

1956 births
Living people
American computer scientists
Usenet people
Internet pioneers
Computer security academics
Fellows of the Association for Computing Machinery
Fellow Members of the IEEE
Georgia Tech alumni
Purdue University faculty